Yuridia Remixes is the first solo compilation of remixes by Mexican singer Yuridia. After a few weeks of being released, the album entered the Top 100 Amprofon popular chart which contains the top 100 albums of each week in Mexico. In just 6 weeks, her remixes album reached number 59. The album remained on the chart for nearly two months.

Track listing

Yuridia albums
2008 remix albums
Sony Music Latin remix albums
RCA Records remix albums